A skin bridge is a penile skin adhesion. It most commonly occurs as a consequence of an improperly healed circumcision, being formed when the  inner lining of the remaining foreskin attaches to another part of the penis (normally the glans) as the cut heals. While less common, skin bridges can also occur in uncircumcised men  due to difficulty of cleaning, resulting in buildups of smegma underneath wide skin bridges, but this is typically a minor inconvenience and does not lead to further issues. However, in more severe cases, this condition can result in painful erections, sometimes requiring surgical correction.

References

External links 
 Pictures of skin bridges

Circumcision